Richard Bradshaw was an English professional footballer. He played for Blackpool, his only professional club, between 1908 and 1911. The Padiham-born player made 29 Football League appearances for the Seasiders.

References

Year of birth missing
People from Padiham
English footballers
Blackpool F.C. players
Year of death missing
Association football wing halves